Atrium (styled as ATRiuM), officially ATRiuM: Cardiff Faculty of Creative and Cultural Industries and also known as ATRiuM Building, forms part of the Cardiff campus of the University of South Wales, along with Atlantic House in Tyndall Street. It is located in the Adamsdown area of Cardiff city centre, Wales. The building was first opened as a university building by the University of Glamorgan on 29 November 2007. A new extension (ATRiuM 2A) added in September 2014 and second (ATRiuM 2B) in 2016.

Phase 1

Opened on 29 November 2007, it is home to one of the university's five faculties, CCI (the Cardiff School of Creative & Cultural Industries). The building is located on 86-88 Adam Street, near Cardiff Queen Street railway station.

The building comprises a refurbished former BT office block, Enterprise House, and an extension, linked by a glass atrium. It houses many of the facilities which were formerly based at the campus in Trefforest. These include a television studio, two tiered theatre, auditoriums, sound studios, learning resource centre and gallery.

ATRiuM's official launch was compered by actress Siân Phillips and TV presenter Rhodri Owen and there were performances from harpist Catrin Finch and singers Elin Manahan Thomas and Daisy Blue, who was accompanied on the piano by her father Mal Pope.

A temporary Students Union building was located at the rear of the building which opened in September 2009 until it moved to ATRiuM 2A, which opened in September 2014.

Phase 2 (ATRiuM 2A and 2B)

ATRiuM has expanded on the western side of the original structure (phase 1) on un-used land on the eastern side and the site of an old garage on the western side. The new two storey ATRiuM 2A includes part of the South Wales Business School, as well as a Students Union bar and an 'Ideas factory'. It opened for the new term in September 2014. The eastern side ATRiuM 2B, will be a five-storey building with new teaching facilities.

Facilities
Amongst the key ATRiuM facilities are a design studio, television studio, 180-seat theatre space, cinema, 180 seat main lecture theatre, a cafe and advice shops.

In July 2010, it was filmed for The Sarah Jane Adventures''' fifth series episode The Man Who Never Was'' (the final episode filmed before Elisabeth Sladen's death in 2011).

Notes

External links
 
Official website of the Cardiff Campus

Adamsdown
Education in Cardiff
University of South Wales
Buildings and structures in Cardiff